Cnemaspis koynaensis, the Koyna dwarf gecko, is a species of diurnal, rock-dwelling, insectivorous gecko endemic to  India. It is distributed in Maharashtra.

References

 Cnemaspis koynaensis

koynaensis
Reptiles of India
Reptiles described in 2019